Ankita Bhambri (Hindi: अंकिता भाम्बरी; born 28 October 1986) is an Indian former professional tennis player and coach. 

Her career-high singles ranking is world No. 332, which she achieved in May 2006. Her highest doubles ranking is world No. 299, which she reached in October 2005.

In her career, Bhambri won a total of nine singles and nine doubles titles at tournaments of the ITF Circuit. She has played on the WTA Tour on five occasions, losing in round one at Hyderabad (2004), Hyderabad & Kolkata (2005), and Bangalore & Kolkata (2006).

Playing for India Fed Cup team, Bhambri has a win–loss record of 8–14.

ITF Circuit finals

Singles: 18 (9–9)

Doubles: 17 (9–8)

Personal life
Ankita's sister Sanaa, brother Yuki and cousins Prerna and Prateek Bhambri also play tennis professionally.

References

External links
 
 
 

Living people
People from New Delhi
Indian female tennis players
Tennis players at the 2002 Asian Games
Tennis players at the 2006 Asian Games
Asian Games medalists in tennis
1986 births
Sportswomen from Delhi
Racket sportspeople from Delhi
21st-century Indian women
21st-century Indian people
Medalists at the 2006 Asian Games
Asian Games silver medalists for India